The 2020–21 Brighton & Hove Albion W.F.C. season was the club's 30th season in existence and their third in the FA Women's Super League, the highest level of the football pyramid. Along with competing in the WSL, the club also contested two domestic cup competitions: the FA Cup and the League Cup.

Summary

On 6 September, Brighton played Birmingham in their opening match of the season in what was their first league match in 6 months. The Seagulls won 2–0 at home with goals from Megan Connolly and Inessa Kaagman. On 27 September, Brighton played Birmingham again, this time coming in the quarter final of the 2019–20 FA Cup in which they lost on penalties. The cup overlapped the new season due to the postponements as a result of the COVID-19 pandemic. Brighton's first defeat of the campaign came on the 4 October in their third league game, a 3–0 away loss against Manchester United. In the 2–2 away draw at Everton on 18 October, Kayleigh Green was seen to be shown two yellow cards by referee Lucy Oliver but was not sent off, baffling Toffees manager Willie Kirk.

Brighton reached the semi-final of the 2020–21 FA Cup where they were defeated 3–0 away at Arsenal on 31 October 2021, after Coronavirus delayed the tournament into the next season.

Squad

Pre-season

FA Women's Super League

Results summary

Results by matchday

Results

League table

Women's FA Cup 

As a member of the top two tiers, Brighton will enter the FA Cup in the fourth round proper. Originally scheduled to take place on 31 January 2021, it was delayed due to COVID-19 restrictions. Due to the delay, the competition only reached the fifth round before the end of the season. It resumed at the quarter-final stage the following season on 29 September 2021.

FA Women's League Cup

Transfers

Transfers in

Loans in

Transfers out

Loans out

Squad statistics

Appearances 

Starting appearances are listed first, followed by substitute appearances after the + symbol where applicable.

|-
! colspan=14 style=background:#dcdcdc; text-align:center|Goalkeepers

|-
! colspan=14 style=background:#dcdcdc; text-align:center|Defenders

   
|-
! colspan=14   style=background:#dcdcdc; text-align:center|Midfielders                 

|-                                
! colspan=14 style=background:#dcdcdc; text-align:center|Forwards

|-
|colspan="14"|Joined during 2021–22 season but competed in the postponed 2020–21 FA Cup:

|-
|colspan="14"|Players away from the club on loan:

|-
|colspan="14"|Players who appeared for the club but left during the season:

|-
|}

References 

Brighton & Hove Albion W.F.C. seasons
Brighton and Hove Albion